The 2017 Caribbean Series (Serie del Caribe) was the 59th edition of the international competition featuring the champions of the Cuban National Series, Dominican Professional Baseball League, Mexican Pacific League, Puerto Rican Professional Baseball League, and Venezuelan Professional Baseball League. It took place from February 1 to 7, 2017 at the Nuevo Estadio Tomateros in Culiacán, Mexico.

Criollos de Caguas defeated hosts Águilas de Mexicali for the championship.

Participating teams

Preliminary round

Time zone: Mexican Pacific Time (UTC–7)

Knockout stage

Semi-finals

Final

References

External links
Official Site

Caribbean
2017 in Caribbean sport
Caribbean Series
2017
International baseball competitions hosted by Mexico
Caribbean Series